See also Crawford Medal

The IAFA William L. Crawford Fantasy Award (short: Crawford award) is a literary award given to a writer whose first fantasy book was published during the preceding 18 months. It's one of several awards presented by the International Association for the Fantastic in the Arts (IAFA), and is presented at the conference each March in Orlando.  The award is named after the publisher and editor, William L. Crawford.

The Prize was conceived and established with the help of Andre Norton, who continued to sponsor it for many years.

List of recipients

References

External links 
Locus SF Awards Overview
IAFA Award Recipients 1985 - present

Fantasy awards
Awards established in 1985
Debut fantasy novels
1985 establishments in Florida